Mattagami may refer to:
 Mattagami River, Northeastern Ontario, Canada
 Mattagami First Nation, situated near the Mattagami River

See also
 Matagami, a town in Quebec, Canada